Red Krayola (originally Red Crayola) is an American avant rock band from Houston, Texas formed in 1966 by the trio of singer/guitarist Mayo Thompson, drummer Frederick Barthelme, and bassist Steve Cunningham. 

The group were part of the 1960s Texas psychedelic music scene and were signed to independent record label International Artists, subsequently becoming labelmates with the 13th Floor Elevators. Their confrontational, experimental approach employed noise and free improvisation. The group disbanded in the late 1960s, but were resurrected in the late 1970s when Thompson moved to England and found favor in the post-punk scene.

Thompson has continued using the name, in its legally altered spelling for performances or releases in the US, for his musical projects since. The group has released recordings on European labels such as Rough Trade and Recommended. In the mid-1990s, Thompson returned to the United States, signing with Drag City and releasing further albums.

History

1960s
The Red Crayola was formed in Houston, Texas by Mayo Thompson and Frederick Barthelme (son of architect Donald Barthelme) at the University of St. Thomas in mid-july 1966. Mayo Thompson remarks he was inspired to start the band after a trip to Europe in 1965. Frederick Barthelme said "Red Krayola" was "a name we took as a sort of parody of the clever California band names of that moment, a name that had come to us while trailing down Main Street in my roofless (courtesy of the sculptor Jim Love) blue Fiat", the name was also a homage to Mayo's mother Hazel's career as an art teacher After going through an array of other players, the band settled on Steve Cunningham as their bassist (who previously collaborated with Malachi on the 'Holy Music' album) who in September 1966 joined the band alongside his friend Bonnie Emerson and then later Danny Schact. For a while this was the original lineup of the band - at that point The Red Crayola were a cover band playing songs like "Louie Louie", "House of The Rising Sun", "Eight Miles High" and an extremely sped up version of "Hey Joe". Later, the band got a gig (with the help of Luana Anderson) at Mark Froman's club called Love, their main place to perform (as they later garnered a reputation for only being able to play clubs and venues once before being asked to never come back). Later on they reverted back to just Mayo, Steve and Rick - the original trio that went on to record The Parable of Arable Land.

The band formed a secondary group of shifting membership of about 50 people called "The Familiar Ugly", which consisted of all those who had perform with the band on stage, using unconventional techniques and instruments in order to make their music.

The band performed at a Battle of the Bands event that was held at the Gulfgate Center, Houston's first shopping mall - it was at this event where they met record producer Lelan Rogers who happened to be there in hopes of purchasing a parakeet - The Red Crayola were signed to International Artists and told to bring their 20 friends (The Familiar Ugly) with them.

The album Coconut Hotel was recorded in 1967 but rejected by International Artists for its lack of commercial potential. It departed completely from the full-sounding guitar/bass/drums/vocals rock sound of the Red Krayola's first album. The album did not see release until 1995. During this period, the band performed concerts in Berkeley, California, and Los Angeles where their music resembled that of Coconut Hotel more than any of their other albums. These performances are captured on Live 1967. The Red Krayola also performed with guitarist John Fahey and recorded a studio album of music in collaboration with him, but International Artists demanded possession of the tapes. Those tapes are lost.

The band's second album to see release was 1968's God Bless the Red Krayola and All Who Sail With It. Following the cease and desist letter they received from Binney & Smith, the company which manufactured Crayola crayons, the band changed the spelling of their name to Red Krayola. The album was not as well received as the band's first release so they disbanded. Studio demos by the original Red Crayola (Mayo Thompson, Steve Cunningham and Frederick Barthelme) were released on the 1980 compilation of International Artists rarities, Epitaph for a Legend.

Founding member Frederick Barthelme later said, "In short, the Red Crayola was both a mockery of the California bands and the hippie culture, and an alternative to it, though of course, being as the audience was made up of hippies, nobody really noticed, and that was okay, too, because all we wanted to do was play the crack-ball stuff, be heard, attack whatever conventions were around, and have a good time doing it."

1970s–1980s
In 1970, Thompson and Barthelme formed a short-lived Houston band called Saddlesore with Cassell Webb; the trio released one single on the short lived label Texas Revolution with "Old Tom Clark" on the A-side and "Pig Ankle Strut" on the B-side (these songs would later be featured on the Red Krayola singles compilation album released in 2004). Shortly after, the band split up and Thompson left the music business and pursued other projects until 1973 when he moved to England and joined conceptual art collective Art & Language. 

Thompson continued to make music, both under his own name and as the Red Crayola (reverting to the original spelling in Europe). The next incarnation of the group was a duo: Thompson and American drummer Jesse Chamberlain. The two recorded the single "Wives in Orbit" and the album Soldier Talk, with the latter featuring cameos by Lora Logic and members of Pere Ubu, both of which could be seen as musical responses to punk rock. Radar Records reissued Parable of Arable Land in 1978 in the UK, accompanied by a flexi-disc, on which was an up-tempo version of Hurricane Fighter Plane recorded in July 1978, with an apparent punk rock influence as well.  His collaborations in the 1970s and 1980s read like a roll-call of the avant-garde and experimental artists and musicians of the era. The Red Crayola teamed up with the British-American conceptual art collective Art & Language in 1973, who Thompson described as "the baddest bastards on the block", for three LPs: 1976's Corrected Slogans, 1981's Kangaroo? (also featuring the Raincoats' Gina Birch, Lora Logic of Essential Logic and Swell Maps' Epic Soundtracks) and 1983's Black Snakes. Thompson joined Pere Ubu for a period in the early 1980s, performing on their albums The Art of Walking and Song of the Bailing Man, and provided soundtrack music for Derek Jarman. Throughout this time he worked with Geoff Travis, the founder of Rough Trade Records, as a producer for many other seminal experimental and alternative rock acts, including the Fall (1980's Grotesque (After the Gramme)), the Raincoats, Scritti Politti, Blue Orchids, Cabaret Voltaire, Stiff Little Fingers, Kleenex/LiLiPUT, the Chills and Primal Scream.

1990s–present
The 1990s found Red Krayola with a new audience, who came to the group via musicians associated with Chicago's post-rock scene and in particular the Drag City label, who had joined the band's ever-shifting line-up for a number of releases including the LPs The Red Krayola (1994), Hazel (1996), and Fingerpainting (1999). These were, among others, Jim O'Rourke and David Grubbs of Gastr del Sol, the post-conceptual visual artist Stephen Prina, German painter Albert Oehlen, George Hurley (formerly of Minutemen and Firehose), Tom Watson of Slovenly, Sandy Yang, Elisa Randazzo and John McEntire of Tortoise. In 2006, the group issued an album, Introduction, and an EP, Red Gold.

In 1995, Drag City re-released 1967's Coconut Hotel, and in 1998 issued The Red Krayola Live 1967 with material from the Angry Arts Festival and Berkeley Folk Music Festival including their live collaboration with John Fahey.

In 2007, Drag City released Sighs Trapped by Liars, another collaboration of Red Krayola with Art & Language, followed in 2010 with another, Five American Portraits, which consists of musical portraits of Wile E. Coyote, President George W Bush, President Jimmy Carter, John Wayne, and Ad Reinhardt, with vocals by Gina Birch. In 2016 came Baby and Child Care, recorded in 1984.

Cover versions
"Hurricane Fighter Plane," the lead track from The Parable of Arable Land, has been covered several times, notably by Nik Turner's post-Hawkwind outfit Inner City Unit; by Alien Sex Fiend in 1986, Scottish act Future Pilot AKA in 1996, The Dwarves, and the Pin Group, led by Roy Montgomery. The Cramps covered the song in performance April 19, 1980 at The Venue in London.

Really Red recorded "War Sucks" for their 1984 Rest in Pain LP. Tracks from God Bless the Red Krayola and All Who Sail With It have been covered by Manos Hatzidakis, whose 1982 version of "Sherlock Holmes" was released as "Σχόλιο για τον Σέρλοκ Χολμς"; Boston band Galaxie 500, who included "Victory Garden" on the 1985 album On Fire, and the Soup Dragons, who performed "Listen To This" in 1987 in a Peel Session.
Noise rock band Barkmarket covered "Pink Stainless Tail" in 1989 for their second album, Easy Listening. Madlib sampled "Former Reflections Enduring Doubt" in 2014 for the track "Centauri" on the album Rock Konducta, Pt. 2. Spacemen 3 recorded a version of "Transparent Radiation" (from The Parable of Arable Land), and Spectrum, fronted by ex–Spacemen 3 frontman Peter Kember, released an EP in 2009 with "War Sucks" as the title track.

Discography

Studio albums
 The Parable of Arable Land (1967)
 God Bless the Red Krayola and All Who Sail With It (1968)
 Soldier-Talk (1979)
 Three Songs on a Trip to the United States (1983)
 Malefactor, Ade (1989)
 The Red Krayola (1994)
 Coconut Hotel (1995, recorded 1967)
 Hazel (1996)
 Fingerpainting (1999)
 Introduction (2006)

with Art & Language
 Corrected Slogans (1976)
 Kangaroo? (1981)
 Black Snakes (1983)
 Sighs Trapped by Liars (2007)
 Five American Portraits (2010)
 Baby and Child Care (2016, recorded 1984)

EPs
 Micro-Chips and Fish (1979)
 Amor and Language (1995)
 Blues, Hollers and Hellos (2000)
 Red Gold (2006)

Compilation and remix albums
 Deliverance (1996)
 Singles (2004)
 Hurricane Fighter Plane (2006)
 Fingerpointing (2008)

Soundtracks
 Japan in Paris in L.A. (2004)

Live albums
 Live 1967 (1998)
 Live in Paris 13/12/1978 (1998)

References

External links

The Red Krayola on Discogs

Thorough discography
The Red Krayola on Drag City
Piece Red Krayola's importance from NewYorkNightTrain.com

Drag City (record label) artists
Musical groups established in 1966
Musical groups from Houston
Psychedelic rock music groups from Texas
Outsider musicians
Protopunk groups
Radar Records artists
Rough Trade Records artists
1966 establishments in Texas
American experimental rock groups
Glass Records artists